Lukas Ferdinand Schlöth (25 January 1818, Basel - 2 August 1891, Lutzenberg) was a Swiss sculptor in the late Classical style.

Life and work 

He was born in Basel to Heinrich Ludwig Schlöth and Maria Salome Treu as the sixth of ten children. His father was locksmith from Berlin and became a citizen of Binningen in 1809 and of Basel in 1820. In Basel he established a workshop as a blacksmith beside the Birsig. Following an apprenticeship with his father, he was employed in his shop for several years. When his father died in 1839, he took over the workshop and operated it together with his older brother, Friedrich Ludwig. During this time, he also took drawing lessons from Hieronymus Hess and studied modeling with the sculptor . 

With twenty-five years of age, in 1843, he decided to study sculpture in Rome. By 1847, he opened his own studio there.  One of his teachers was probably his fellow Swiss emigrant, Heinrich Max Imhof; with whom he would later develop a hateful rivalry. In Rome, he would become influenced by Bertel Thorvaldsen which was to be seen in his works on sculptures of the Greek mythological figures. In 1855, he won a competition for a monument honoring Arnold von Winkelried, to be erected in Stans. It was inaugurated in 1865, and immediately made him one of the most prominent Swiss sculptors. This was followed by a monument commemorating the Battle of St. Jakob an der Birs, which was completed in 1872. TIn Rome he experienced financial hardships and he often wasn't able to work due to a lack of Carrara marble. He was living modestly and mainly worked for his clientele from Basel. He remained in Rome until 1874, when he married the wealthy widow, Emma Müller-Gengenbach, and returned to Switzerland. There he divided his time between Basel and Lutzenberg. In Lutzenberg, the family owned an estate, which was brought into the marriage by his wife. 

In 1873, he won another competition, for a monument honoring Wilhelm von Tegetthoff in Vienna, but the project never came to fruition. He also created a series of busts for the Kunstmuseum Basel. Most of his works are made of white Carrara marble. About hundred sculptures of him are known, of which more than thirty are only known through historic photographs or literary descriptions. 

In addition to his sculpting, he took some students; notably Richard Kissling. In Rome, he influenced the young Reinhold Begas. Among his later pupils was his nephew, . In Ferdinand Schlöths last will, Achilles was mentioned as the sole heir of his sculpture workshop.

References

Further reading 
 Stephan E. Hauser: Schlöth, Lukas Ferdinand. In: Biografisches Lexikon der Schweizer Kunst. Vol.2 Zürich 1998, pgs. 940 f. 
 Stefan Hess: Zwischen Winckelmann und Winkelried. Der Basler Bildhauer Ferdinand Schlöth (1818–1891). Berlin 2010, .
 Tomas Lochman: Antiche sculture nell'opera dell'artista svizzero Ferdinand Schlöth (1818–1891). In: Gli ateliers degli scultori. Atti del secondo convegno internazionale sulle gipsoteche. Fondazione Canova, Possagno. A cura di Mario Guderzo, Terra Ferma 2010, pgs. 145–156.
 Brigitte Meles: Das St. Jakobs-Denkmal von Ferdinand Schlöth. In: Werner Geiser (Ed.): Ereignis – Mythos – Deutung, 1444–1994 St. Jakob an der Birs. Basel 1994, pgs.140–164.
 Otto Waser: Schlöth, Lukas Ferdinand. In: Schweizerisches Künstler-Lexikon. Redigiert von Carl Brun, Vol. 3. Frauenfeld 1913, pgs. 57–62.

External links 

 
 , with self-portrait bust.
 
 Works in the Kunstmuseum Basel

1818 births
1891 deaths
Swiss sculptors
Swiss emigrants to Italy
Artists from Basel-Stadt